Tom Rush is the 1970 album from pioneer Folk rock musician Tom Rush. He covers songs from fellow folkies Jackson Browne, Murray McLauchlan, James Taylor and David Wiffen.  Guest musicians were David Bromberg on Dobro and Red Rhodes on Steel Guitar. The album spent sixteen weeks on the Billboard 200, peaking at #76 on May 23, 1970.

Track listing
"Driving Wheel" (David Wiffen) – 5:22
"Rainy Day Man" (James Taylor, Zachary Wiesner) – 3:07
"Drop Down Mama" (Sleepy John Estes) – 2:33
"Old Man's Song" (Murray McLauchlan) – 3:22
"Lullaby" (Jesse Colin Young) – 3:45
"These Days"  (Jackson Browne) – 2:40
"Wild Child" (Fred Neil) – 3:13
"Colors of the Sun" (Jackson Browne) – 3:51
"Livin' in the Country" (Wyatt Day, Wendy Winsted) – 2:31
"Child's Song" (Murray McLauchlan) – 4:09

Personnel

Musicians
 Tom Rush – guitar, vocals
 Trevor Veitch – guitar, mandolin, mandocello
 David Bromberg – dobro (track 1)
 Ed Freeman – 12-string guitar (track 4)
 Red Rhodes – steel guitar (track 8)
 Warren Bernhardt – organ, piano
 Paul Griffin – organ (track 1)
 Duke Bardwell – bass
 Ron Carter – acoustic bass (track 5)
 Herbie Lovelle – drums
 Julie Held – orchestral arrangements

Technical
 Ed Freeman – producer, arranger
 Jim Reeves – engineer
 Don Hunstein – photography

References

Tom Rush albums
1970 albums
Columbia Records albums